

Trøndersk, also known as trøndermål or trøndsk, is a Norwegian dialect, or rather a group of several sub-dialects. As is the case with all Norwegian dialects, it has no standardised orthography, and its users write either Bokmål, or in the case of 0.6% Nynorsk.

It is spoken in the region Trøndelag, the district Nordmøre and the municipality Bindal in Norway as well as in Frostviken in northern Jämtland, Sweden, which was colonized in the 18th century by settlers from Nord-Trøndelag and transferred to Sweden as late as 1751. The dialect is, among other things, perhaps mostly characterized by the use of apocope, palatalization and the use of voiced retroflex flaps (thick L). Historically it also applied to contiguous regions of Jämtland and Härjedalen (which sometimes but rarely are referred to as "Øst-Trøndelag" by locals and Norwegians).

The word trøndersk is an adjective describing a Trønder (a person from Trøndelag) or anything coming from or relating to Trøndelag (including the dialect).

Some of the more conspicuous variations of these dialects of Norwegian, in addition to the aforementioned apocope and palatalization, are that most of the personal pronouns are pronounced differently than in Standard Norwegian, e.g. Variation among personal pronouns are common in most Norwegian dialects.

Phonology
Trøndersk features phonemic pitch accent in monosyllabic words, namely those that were disyllabic in Old Norse but later became monosyllabic due to apocope. This creates minimal pairs not found in most other varieties of Norwegian. In dialects with the dative case an example of that would be the difference between the dative form of a neuter noun as compared with the nominative form - the latter is pronounced with Tone 1, whereas the former often has Tone 2. Outsiders are rarely able to hear the distinction between them as in most other varieties of Norwegian (and Swedish) pitch accent is phonemic only in non-final syllables of polysyllabic words.

This sound is also found in some dialects of Swedish.

In the subdialect of the traditional district of Namdalen, Old Norse  is often realized as a wide diphthong . This is also the case in the interior dialect Sogn, as well as in Jamtlandic, the dialect of Voss, and the Icelandic language.

See also
 Jamtlandic dialects

References

Bibliography

 
 

Norwegian dialects